Félix Mantilla defeated Roger Federer in the final, 7–5, 6–2, 7–6(10–8) to win the men's singles tennis title at the 2003 Italian Open.

Andre Agassi was the defending champion, but lost in the first round to David Ferrer.

Seeds
A champion seed is indicated in bold text while text in italics indicates the round in which that seed was eliminated.

  Andre Agassi (first round)
  Juan Carlos Ferrero (semifinals, retired due to a shoulder injury)
  Carlos Moyá (third round)
  Roger Federer (final)
  Andy Roddick (second round)
  Marat Safin (withdrew due to a left wrist injury)
  Albert Costa (third round)
  Jiří Novák (third round)
  Paradorn Srichaphan (first round)
  Sjeng Schalken (first round)
  David Nalbandian (first round)
  Rainer Schüttler (quarterfinals)
  Sébastien Grosjean (first round)
  Gustavo Kuerten (first round)
  Guillermo Coria (third round)
  Younes El Aynaoui (first round)

Draw

Finals

Top half

Section 1

Section 2

Bottom half

Section 3

Section 4

External links
 2003 Internazionali BNL d'Italia Singles draw

Men's Singles
Italian Open - Singles